The 1966 Meath Intermediate Football Championship is the 40th edition of the Meath GAA's premier club Gaelic football tournament for intermediate graded teams in County Meath, Ireland. The tournament consists of 16 teams. The championship starts with a group stage and then progresses to a knock out stage.

No team was regraded from the 1965 S.F.C.
Bohermeen, Oldcastle and Donaghmore were promoted after claiming the 1965 Meath Junior Football Championship title, runners-up spot and Junior 'A' Divisional runners-up spot respectively. Rathmolyon's application to be promoted was also granted by the Co. Board.

At the end of the season Kilberry and St. Peter's Dunboyne applied to be regraded to the 1967 J.F.C.

On 29 October 1967, Seneschalstown claimed their 2nd Intermediate championship title when they defeated Bohermeen 0-11 to 0-3 in the final at Pairc Tailteann.

Team changes
 

The following teams have changed division since the 1965 championship season.

From I.F.C.
Promoted to 1966 S.F.C.
 Kilmainhamwood  -  (Intermediate Champions)

Relegated to 1966 J.A.F.C.
 Athboy
 Carlanstown
 Drumconrath
 Gaeil Colmcille 'B'

To I.F.C.
Regraded from 1965 S.F.C.
 None

Promoted from 1965 J.A.F.C. & J.B.F.C.
 Bohermeen - (Junior & Junior 'B' Divisional Champions)
 Oldcastle - (Junior Runners-Up & Junior 'A' Divisional Champions)
 Donaghmore - (Junior 'A' Divisional Runners-Up)
 Rathmolyon - (Application to be promoted approved by the Co. Board)

Group stage
There are 4 groups called Group A, B, C and D. The top finisher in each group will qualify for the Semi-Finals. Many results were unavailable in the Meath Chronicle.

Group A

Round 1:
 Bohermeen 0-5, 0-5 Oldcastle, Kells, 29/4/1966,
 Martry w, l Kilberry, Gibbstown, 29/4/1966,

Round 2:
 Bohermeen w, l Kilberry, Gibbstown, 12/6/1966,
 Martry +3, -3 Oldcastle, Kells, 3/7/1966,

Round 3:
 Bohermeen 0-8, 1-4 Martry, Kells, 28/8/1966,
 Oldcastle w/o, scr Kilberry,

Group B

Round 1:
 Duleek w, l Syddan, Castletown, 24/4/1966,
 Slane w, l Rathkenny, Castletown, 24/4/1966,

Round 2:
 Slane d, d Syddan, Castletown, 1/5/1966,
 Duleek d, d Rathkenny, Castletown, 12/6/1966,

Round 3:
 Syddan -vs- Rathkenny, Castletown, 19/6/1966,
 Slane d, d Duleek, Pairc Tailteann, 3/7/1966,

Semi-Final Playoff:
 Duleek 2-7, 0-7 Slane, Pairc Tailteann, 31/7/1966,

Group C

Round 1:
 Enfield w, l Rathmolyon, Trim, 24/4/1966,
 Ballivor w, l Ballinabrackey, Trim, 3/7/1966,

Round 2:
 Ballivor w, l Enfield, Trim, 31/7/1966,
 Ballinabrackey w, l Rathmolyon, Trim, 31/7/1966,

Round 3:
 Ballivor w/o, scr Rathmolyon, 
 Enfield -vs- Ballinabrackey,

Group D

Round 1:
 Seneschalstown w, l Donaghmore, Skryne, 24/4/1966,
 Warrenstown -vs- St. Peter's Dunboyne, Drumree, 22/5/1966,

Round 2:
 Seneschalstown w, l Warrenstown, Curraha, 19/6/1966,
 Donaghmore -vs- St. Peter's Dunboyne, Drumree, 19/6/1966,

Round 3:
 Seneschalstown w, l St. Peter's Dunboyne, Skryne, 3/7/1966,
 Donaghmore -vs- Warrenstown,

Knock-out Stages
The teams in the Semi-Finals are the first and second placed teams from each group.

Semi-Final:
 Duleek 1-6, 0-2 Bohermeen, Pairc Tailteann, 4/9/1966, 
 Ballivor 2-11, 1-5 Seneschalstown, Pairc Tailteann, 4/9/1966,
 
Final:
 Duleek 5-7, 2-7 Ballivor, Pairc Tailteann, 9/10/1966,

References

External links

Meath Intermediate Football Championship
Meath Intermediate Football Championship